El Bilga Khatun or Ilbilga Katun was the wife of the 8th century Göktürk Turkic Qaghan, Ilterish Qaghan, the founder of the Second Turkic Khaganate and the mother of Bilgä Qaghan, the fourth Qaghan of the same Khaganate. She is mentioned in the Orkhon inscriptions erected in honor of Bilgä Qaghan and his brother.

Orkhon inscriptions 

El Bilga Khatun was the wife of the 8th century Göktürk Turkic Qaghan, Ilterish Qaghan, the founder of the Second Turkic Khaganate, the mother of Bilgä Qaghan, the fourth Qaghan of the same Khaganate, and also the mother of General Kul Tigin. In history, she has been mentioned in the 8th century Orkhon inscriptions. The one erected in honor of Bilgä Qaghan and his brother says: "But the Turks’ Heaven above, and the Turks holy Yer-sub did as follows: to the end that the Turkish people should not perish but that it should [again] become a people, they raised up my father Elterish kagan and my mother Elbilga katun, supporting them from the heights of Heaven."

Relationship with Ilterish Qaghan 

According to the Orkhon inscriptions, she was the biggest supporter and helper of her husband. El Bilga Khatun and Ilterish Khagan were known for their great unity which was rare at that time between a husband and wife. When a shaman was given a goose to eat by her, the shaman said that she and her husband were taken to heaven and brought back to earth. Another source says that one of the Orkhon inscriptions said, "My father, Ilterish Khagan, grabbed my mother, Ilbilge Khatun, from the top of the sky, so that the Turkish bout (people) would not disappear, so that there would be people." This indicates that their relationship was extremely strong. Recent findings and official Chinese sources support the claim that both Ilterish Kagan and El Bilga Khatun worked together in state administration.

Death 
It is unknown how the wife of Ilterish Qaghan died, the only thing known about her death or disappearance is that it was during the time when Ilterish and Tonyukuk attacked the Yenisei Kyrgyz. Inel and Tonyukuk were in charge of a special mourning ceremony that was held a while after her death.

See also
İlbilge Hatun (fictional character), inspired by the historical person

Footnotes

References

Books

Journals

Websites 
 
 
 
 
 

8th-century Turkic women
Year of birth unknown
Queens consort
Turkic female royalty